Arthur Smith was an English professional rugby league footballer who played in the 1920s.

Playing career

Club career
Arthur Smith made his début for Warrington in the 0-35 defeat by Barrow at Craven Park, Barrow on Saturday 24 November 1923, and he played his last match for Warrington on Saturday 12 January 1924.

References

External links
Search for "Smith" at rugbyleagueproject.org

English rugby league players
Place of birth missing
Place of death missing
Rugby league centres
Rugby league players from Cumbria
Warrington Wolves players
Year of birth missing
Year of death missing